Wong Ah Fook Street is a major one-way road in Johor Bahru, Johor, Malaysia. It is located in Johor Bahru's central business district and is also one of the busiest roads in the city.

It was named after Wong Ah Fook, a Chinese man who came to Singapore in 1854 and established himself in building construction and other businesses. The town of Johor Bahru was founded in 1855 by Wong Ah Fook and Temenggong Daeng Ibrahim.

Attractions
Meldrum Walk, Johor Bahru City Square and Komtar JBCC.

List of junctions

Roads in Johor Bahru